In total there are 317 listed buildings in the city of Southampton, of which 15 are Grade I, 20 are Grade II* and the remainder Grade II.

Key

Listed buildings

Notes
Location is given first as a grid reference, based on the British national grid reference system (or OSGB36) of the Ordnance Survey; and second as World Geodetic System 84coordinates, used by the Global Positioning System.
Unless otherwise stated, the descriptions are based on those on the Historic England database.
The Historic England database is the official listing and includes a description of the property, the reasons for designation, the date of listing and an extract from the Ordnance Survey map at a scale of 1:2500 pinpointing the exact location of the building.
The British Listed Buildings database also includes the details of the property from the English Heritage database, together with links to Google/street view, Ordnance Survey and Bing maps/birds eye view.

Grade II listed buildings
These are listed separately:
Grade II listed buildings in Southampton: A–B
Grade II listed buildings in Southampton: C
Grade II listed buildings in Southampton: D–L
Grade II listed buildings in Southampton: M–O
Grade II listed buildings in Southampton: P–R
Grade II listed buildings in Southampton: S
Grade II listed buildings in Southampton: T–Z

References

Sources

Southampton City Council: Historic Environment Record – Listed Buildings in Southampton
British Listed Buildings – Listed Buildings in Southampton 
Ancient Monuments in Southampton

Southampton